Domenico Massimo Pupillo (1922 – 12 December 1999) was an Italian film director.

Life and career
Puplillo was born in Rodi Garganico, Apulia in 1922. He started his career in film through his acquaintance Fernandel as Marcel Pagnol's assistant. He claims to have made over 250 short films before the release of his film Gli amichi dell'Isola, a feature film set in Sardinia with unprofessional actors. After directing Terror-Creatures from the Grave, he went on two direct two more horror films in a row: Bloody Pit of Horror and La vendetta di Lady Morgan.

After making these horror films, Pupillo stated that he originally made them to get out of making documentary films and enter the commercial film market. After making La vendetta di Lady Morgan he declared he was finished with making horror films with his following directorial work becoming scarce. His follow-ups included the Western Django Kills Softly released in 1967 and the mondo film Love: The Great Unknown. Pupillo also wrote a few mondo films prior to directing including Primitive Love and Sweden: Heaven and Hell which were both directed by Luigi Scattini and Taboos of the World by Romolo Marcellini.

Pupillo later described himself as "disgusted" by the type of cinema he was making and primarily worked in television during the 1970s. His last feature film was Sa Jana which was shot in Sardinia.

Pupillo died in Rome on 12 December 1999.

Partial filmography

Notes and references

Notes

References

Sources

External links 

1922 births
1999 deaths
Italian film directors